The 2010 UCF Knights football team represented the University of Central Florida in the 2010 NCAA Division I FBS football season. Their head coach was George O'Leary, who was in his seventh season with the team. For the first time in program history, the Knights were nationally ranked following a nationally televised rout of Houston on November 5. For the third time in six years, UCF won the Conference USA Eastern Division and later, became Conference USA champions for the second time in four seasons. As a result, the Knights appeared in the Liberty Bowl, in which they defeated Georgia 10–6, for the first bowl victory in program history. UCF finished the season ranked in both final national polls, 20th in the Coaches Poll, and 21st in the AP Poll.

All games were broadcast live on the UCF-ISP Sports radio network.  The flagship was WYGM "740 The Game" in Orlando.

Personnel

Coaching staff

Roster

Recruiting class

Notes:

Schedule

Rankings

Game summaries

South Dakota

UCF hosted South Dakota, becoming the FCS squad's first-ever FBS opponent.

In a match that analysts said might determine whether or not quarterback Rob Calabrese would get the team for his senior year, he rose to the challenge, throwing 12-of-15 for 176 yards and a touchdown. Jonathan Davis rushed for 107 yards on 20 carries with a touchdown, and A.J. Guyton caught 8 passes for 120 yards and a touchdown. The team never turned the ball over, and didn't suffer a three-and-out. It proved to be UCF's largest margin of victory yet in a season opener.

True freshman quarterback Jeff Godfrey was brought in for the 4th quarter, when the game was already in hand, and led a touchdown drive of his own, passing 6-of-7 for 65 yards.

NC State

In a game where NC State was looking for reprisal following its 2007 upset by the Knights during the team's last meeting, UCF would turn the ball over 5 separate times including a 43-yard interception return by the Wolfpack. Trailing by 21 points at the start of the fourth quarter, the Knights, led by true freshman quarterback Jeff Godfrey, scored two times to bring UCF within 7, but would fumble the ball with 51 seconds left on the clock at the NC State 11-yard line. Godfrey went 7-for-10 for 107 yards, and rushed for 53 yards including two rushing touchdowns. Calabrese went 10-for-18 for 106 yards with 2 interceptions.

Following the loss, debate arose once again over the fate of the Knight's starting quarterback job.

Buffalo

In his first game as the Knights starting quarterback, Jeffrey Godfrey went 15-for-24 for 130 yards. Ronnie Weaver had 8 carries for 49 rushing yards, while Godfrey had 13 carries for 44 yards. Bruce Miller had a 30-yard interception return for a touchdown in the second quarter. DE Darius Nall earned Conference USA defensive player of the week honors with nine tackles, including three tackles for a loss, and two sacks.

With the start Godfrey became the ninth true freshman quarterback to start for the Knights, and only the second along with Daunte Culpepper to win their first start.

Kansas State

In a game where the UCF defense proved dominant on the field while the offense struggled, the Wildcats orchestrated a late 4th quarter comeback scoring two touchdowns, including the winning TD with 24 seconds left on the clock. In his second game as the starting quarterback, Jeff Godfrey rushed for 99 yards, and went 8-for-18 for 92 yards. Godfrey passed Daunte Culpepper's career rushing record of 95 yards with his performance. Ronnie Weaver had 22 carries for 130 rushing yards, including one touchdown. Nick Cattoi was 2-for-4, missing 23-yard and 42-yard field goals.

With the loss, UCF now holds a 2–23 record against opponents from BCS automatic qualifying conferences since joining the FBS in 1996.

UAB

In their conference opener, the Knights proved dominant both offensively and defensively. The Knights were able to capitalize off of Blazer turnovers, scoring three touchdowns from a forced fumble and two interceptions. Jeff Godfrey rushed for 80 yards, and went 9-for-11 for 137 yards. Rob Calabrese went 3-for-3 for 34 yards serving as the second half of the quarterback tandem. Ronnie Weaver rushed for 50 yards on 21 carries for two touchdowns. FS Kemal Ishmael won Conference USA defensive player of the week honors with seven tackles, an interception and forced a fumble.

With the defeat of the Blazers, the Knights ride a 7-game conference winning streak dating back to an October 3, 2009 win over Memphis. The game also represented the first weekday game played at Bright House Networks Stadium since its opening in 2007.

Marshall

Playing for the second-straight week on a Wednesday night in front of a national television audience, the Knights outlasted and dominated the Marshall Thundering Herd in Huntington. UCF has now won 6-straight games against the Thundering Herd, never losing to them as Conference USA foes. In a game that was delayed 68-minutes due to lightning, and in which there was no halftime, the Knights possessed the ball for over 40 minutes while the Thundering Herd held the ball for under 20. Jeff Godfrey rushed for 27 yards, and went 11-for-21 for 138 yards. Rob Calabrese suffered a season ending knee injury on a 2-yard touchdown run in the first quarter. Ronnie Weaver rushed for 150 yards on 30 carries. On Marshall's third play of the second half, A. J. Bouye intercepted Brian Anderson and returned it 42-yards for a touchdown. UCF has now returned three interceptions for touchdowns this season, the Conference USA record is four.

Defeating the Thundering Herd, the Knights now ride an 8-game conference winning streak, tying East Carolina for the nation's fifth longest active conference winning streak. With the win, UCF is off to its best start since the 1998 season when the Knight's went 9–2, and which was also Daunte Culpepper's senior year. UCF ranks atop Conference USA in all defensive categories, and the Knight's defense ranks ninth in the country.

Rice

UCF scored the first touchdown of the game 1:23 after kickoff with two plays completed and held Rice's offensive line from completing a first down until the second quarter of the game. The Knights scored on their first 5 drives and didn't punt until 2:58 left in the 3rd quarter. Jeff Godfrey rushed for 41 yards, and went 13-for-18 for 178 yards. L.D. Crow, the Knight's new second-string quarterback to replace Rob Calabrese, went 5-for-6 for 91 yards. Ronnie Weaver rushed for 53 yards on 15 carries. DE Darius Nall won Conference USA co-defensive player of the week honors for the second time this season with 2.5 sacks, a forced fumble and a pass pressure.

With the defeat of the Owls, the Knights now ride a 9-game conference winning streak, tied for the fourth longest in the nation. UCF is now 21–10 all time on Homecoming weekend and 17–7 (12-3) at home. UCF's defense ranks atop Conference USA in all categories and is ranked seventh nationally. After the game, the Knights received two votes in the USA Today Coaches Poll, 3 votes in the Harris Poll and was ranked 41st in the BCS Standings.

East Carolina

The Knights proved dominant both offensively and defensively throughout the game, garnering their first win against East Carolina in 5 years. The game marked the latest that two undefeated Conference USA teams had played since the conference expanded to 12 teams and started divisional play in 2003. UCF proved so dominant on the field that for the first time since a 48–0 win over Eastern Illinois in 1998, the Knights did not punt the ball. For the entirety of the second half of the game UCF held at least a 14-point advantage. Jeff Godfrey rushed for 43 yards, and went 8-for-12 for 159 yards. Ronnie Weaver earned Conference USA offensive player of the week honors, rushing for a career-high 180 yards on 30 carries for 2 touchdowns. Latavius Murray had 7 carries for 47 yards with 3 touchdowns, and Brian Waters had 2 receptions for 55 yards.

The Knights have now won 4 consecutive games, and own a 10-game conference winning streak, the third longest in the nation. With the defeat of East Carolina the Knights are the only team still undefeated in conference play, and they hold a commanding lead in the Eastern Division. After the game, the Knights received five votes in the AP Poll, 13 votes in the USA Today Coaches Poll, 7 votes in the Harris Poll and was ranked 32nd in the BCS Standings.

Houston

In a game with 1,054 yards of total offense, the Knights true freshman quarterback Jeff Godfrey led the team to a 40–33 victory over the Cougars with three late scoring drives. Godfrey went 15-for-19 for 294 yards with two touchdowns and no interceptions, and 105 yards rushing. Latavius Murray rushed for 78 yards on 11 carries for a touchdown. Ronnie Weaver had 19 carries for 45 yards, and Jamar Newsome had 5 receptions for 123 yards. The Knights only trailed for six-and-a-half minutes the entire game, and dominated the time of possession 36 minutes to the Cougars 24 minutes. UCF has only punted twice in the last eight quarters. QB Jeff Godfrey earned Conference USA offensive player of the week honors, and LB Josh Linam took defensive player of the week honors for their performances.

The Knights now own an 11-game conference winning streak, the third longest active streak in the nation behind Boise State and TCU. With the defeat of the Cougars, the Knights remain the only team undefeated in conference play, and they now hold home-field advantage over Houston in a possible Conference championship game. Following the game, for the first time in school history, UCF received top 25 rankings; #23 in the USA Today Coaches Poll, #25 in the AP Poll and #25 in the Harris Poll.

Southern Miss

The Knights started out fast against the Golden Eagles, storming out to a 14–0 lead by the middle of the 1st quarter. Jeff Godfrey ran for the first TD, then threw a 4-yard pass to Brian Watters for the second. From there the offense faltered, as the Knights defense was worn out by facing their third straight no-huddle offense. Southern Miss scored 31 unanswered points, to jump out to a 31–14 lead halfway through the 4th quarter. With four minutes left Godfrey threw a 40-yard touchdown pass to Jamar Newsome to cut the lead to 10, but the Knights failed to recover an on-side kick. Godfrey 16-of-25 for 190 yards, and threw 2 interceptions. Ronnie Weaver had 12 carries for 112 yards, and Jamar Newsome had 5 receptions for 100 yards and a TD.

The loss dropped the Knights from the polls, but they continued to control their own destiny for the chance to host the 2010 Conference USA Football Championship Game for the third time.

Tulane

Bouncing back from their lost the previous week, the Knights jumped out to a quick lead with a 95-yard kickoff return by Quincy McDuffie. UCF held a 31–0 lead at the end of the 1st quarter, which set a school record for points in a first quarter. The Knights only allowed Tulane two net yards in the first quarter, and at halftime led 38–14. The final play of the game, a Tulane hail mary pass, was intercepted and returned 100-yards by freshman cornerback Jordan Ozerities. Jeff Godfrey went 6-for-8 for 133 yards with two touchdowns and no interceptions. Latavius Murray rushed for 146 yards on 11 carries for a touchdown. Ronnie Weaver had 9 carries for 58 yards, and Kamar Aiken had 2 receptions for 70 yards and an interception. KR Quincy McDuffie earned Conference USA special teams player of the week honors for his performance.

The 61 points scored are the most of Coach George O’Leary's seven-year tenure at UCF. With the win against the Green Wave, and the loss by East Carolina, the Knights continued to control their own destiny for the chance to host the Conference USA Championship Game.

Memphis

Despite the loss by Southern Miss the previous night to lock up the Eastern Division and home-field for the conference championship game for UCF, the Knights played as if they still needed to win. Jeff Godfrey had a signature performance, throwing 14-of-17 for 252 yards and 2 touchdowns, and rushing for a third touchdown. Sophomore running back Latavius Murray added 75 rushing yards with 2 touchdowns. Jamar Newsome had 4 receptions for 118 yards and two touchdowns. In the game, senior defensive end Bruce Miller recorded two sacks against the Tigers, becoming the schools career leader with 32.

With the win, the Knights returned to the national rankings, placing 25th in the USA Today Coaches Poll. UCF finished the regular season with a 9–3 overall record, and a 7–1 record in C-USA. It is the third time in six years that UCF has dropped only one conference game, all three times appearing in the league title game.

Conference USA Championship Game

UCF hosted the Conference USA Championship for the third time in its six years of existence. The Knights jumped out to a quick lead with a 13-play, 73-yard drive that ended with a 5-yard TD pass from Jeff Godfrey to Latavius Murray. UCF would score again as the first-half ended with a 29–yard field goal by Nick Cattoi, which led to a 10–0 Knight lead at the half. The Knights would stretch the lead to 17–0, by scoring on a 36–yard run by Latavius Murray. The UCF defense proved dominant, with five sacks, six quarterback hurries and two interceptions, and did not allow an SMU score until the fourth quarter. UCF defeated SMU 17–7 to capture their second C-USA title. The seven points allowed by the Knights is a C-USA title game record for fewest points allowed to an opponent. The Knights now lead the all-time series against SMU 3–0. Jeffrey Godfrey went 15-for-19 for 167 yards and a touchdown. Godfrey's 78.9% completion percentage is a record for a C-USA championship game. Latavius Murray rushed for 94 yards on 20 carries for a touchdown, and had 2 receptions for 21 yards with a touchdown. Ronnie Weaver had 8 carries for 35 yards, and Kamar Aiken had 4 receptions for 52 yards. For his performance, RB Latavius Murray earned the C-USA Championship Game MVP award.

The Knights tied the school record for wins, 10, and will be playing in the Liberty Bowl for the second time in four years. UCF has now won three-straight games, and 8 of the last 9. Following the game, the Knights placed 24th in the Coaches Poll, 25th in the Harris poll, and in the AP Poll were first in the 'others receiving votes' category, ranking them unofficially at number 26. With the rankings, UCF earned its first appearance in the BCS Standings, ranking 25th overall, and becoming the 83rd team to be represented in the rankings.

Due to the tendency for fans to shake "The Bouncehouse," ESPN2 for their television production set up a camera position outside the stadium to eliminate camera bounce caused by the crowd.

Liberty Bowl

The Knights faced the Georgia Bulldogs in the AutoZone Liberty Bowl. It was UCF's second trip to the bowl in four years, and marked the second meeting between the two schools. The Knights lost the previous meeting, 23–24, in 1999, in a game sometimes known as the "Burglary Between the Hedges." The game marked UCF's first ever bowl win, and their third win over an AQ opponent. UCF had one previous win over an SEC team–a 40–38 win over Alabama at Tuscaloosa in 2000. The win in Tuscaloosa was the Knights' first win over an opponent from an AQ conference.

The Knights started fast out of the gate, with Quincy McDuffie returning the opening kickoff 95-yards for a touchdown, but the play was called back to UCF's 11-yard line due to a holding penalty. After the penalty the drive fizzled, and Blake Clingan would punt the ball, giving Georgia their first possession at their two-yard line. The Bulldogs would drive 95-yards in 9:13, ending with a Blair Walsh 20-yard field goal to give Georgia a 3–0 lead. The Knights would tie the game with a Nick Cattoi 22-yard field goal with 33 seconds left in the first half. The drive started with an interception and 13-yard return by Josh Linam. To open the second-half, Georgia would launch a 13-play, 61-yard drive that ended with a Blair Walsh 41-yard field goal, giving the Bulldogs a 6–3 lead. Behind quarterback Jeffrey Godfrey, who was injured in the first quarter, the Knights drove down the field with a 65-yard drive in the fourth quarter. With 9:01 left, Latavius Murray scored on a 10-yard touchdown run to give the Knights a 10–6 lead that they would not relinquish.

Jeffrey Godfrey went 16-for-29 for 116 yards, and threw two interceptions. Latavius Murray rushed for 104 yards on 18 carries for a touchdown, earning him Liberty Bowl MVP honors. Nick Cattoi was 1-for-1 with a 22-yard field goal, and Reggie Weams and Josh Linam both had interceptions in the game, for 22-yards and 13-yards respectively. DE Bruce Miller recorded 1.5 sacks against the Bulldogs, his 36th career sack. Miller now ranks second in Florida history in sacks, and 5th all-time in the FBS.

With the victory, the Knights set a then-school record with 11 wins, and earned their first win as a nationally ranked BCS squad, cementing the best season in school history up to that point. UCF also finished the year with more wins than any other FBS team in Florida, and was the only team in the state to be nationally ranked in both the BCS and the AP men's basketball poll. The UCF senior class ended their careers with 33 total victories, the most of any UCF senior class.

In addition, George O'Leary for the first time achieved an over .500 record at UCF. With the win, his record is 45–44 with the Knights, and he now sits only three shy of 100 career wins. The win gives him a career record of 4–5 against the Bulldogs.

Awards & Milestones
In addition to winning the Conference USA title, UCF and its players won several other awards. Head coach George O'Leary was named C-USA Coach of the Year for the third time. Having twice won ACC Coach of the Year, O'Leary has now been awarded coach of the year five times, trailing only South Carolina’s Steve Spurrier (six) and Utah’s Dennis Erickson (six) among active FBS coaches. Jeff Godfrey was named C-USA Freshman of the Year, joining Kevin Smith as the only Knights to win the honor. Godfrey ranks eighth in the nation in passing efficiency at 165.28, completing 68.4% of his passes, tops among all FBS quarterbacks. Godfrey also became the first true freshman quarterback to lead his team to an FBS conference championship. Defensive end Bruce Miller was named C-USA Defensive Player of the Year for the second year in a row, becoming only the second conference player to earn the award more than once.

All-Conference Teams
C-USA First Team: Jah Reid, Bruce Miller, Kemal Ishmael, Josh Robinson, Quincy McDuffie
C-USA Second Team: Ronnie Weaver, Darius Nall, Charley Hughlett

School records
Best record: 9–3 (regular season) (T–2007), 11–3 (final including bowl game)
Best regular season conference record: 7–1 (T–2005, 2007)
Highest ranking: #25 (BCS), #21 (AP), #20 (Coaches), #25 (Harris)

Offseason

NFL draft
Two former players were selected in the 2011 NFL Draft:

References

UCF
UCF Knights football seasons
Conference USA football champion seasons
Liberty Bowl champion seasons
UCF Knights football